Behind the Make-Up  is a 1930 American pre-Code drama film directed by Robert Milton and Dorothy Arzner (who was uncredited), and based on the short story "The Feeder" by Mildred Cram. The film stars Hal Skelly, William Powell, Kay Francis, and Fay Wray.

This was the first of seven in which Powell and Francis co-starred, the others being Street of Chance (1930), Paramount on Parade (1930), For the Defense (1930), Ladies' Man (1931), Jewel Robbery (1932), and One Way Passage (1932).

Plot
Good-natured vaudeville clown Hap Brown befriends Gardoni, a vain but penniless comedian contemplating suicide. Trying to help him out, Gardoni initially dismisses Hap's ideas but ultimately steals them and goes on his own to find success. When they meet again, Gardoni takes Hap as a partner in his show, but woos away Hap's girlfriend Marie and marries her. Soon after, as Hap and Marie try to deal with Gardoni's shabby treatment of them, he pursues an extramarital affair with the worldlier, wealthier socialite Kitty, with whom he also racks up a significant gambling debt.

Cast
 Hal Skelly as Hap Brown
 William Powell as Gardoni
 Fay Wray as Marie Gardoni
 Kay Francis as Kitty Parker
 E. H. Calvert as Dawson
 Paul Lukas as Boris
 Jean De Briac as Sculptor
 Torben Meyer as Waiter

Critical reception
Mordaunt Hall, film critic of The New York Times, praised the performances of Powell ("excellent"), Wray ("pleasing"), Skelly ("goes about his part with earnestness and intelligence"), and Francis ("does nicely"), but noted "the story is rather limp and disappointing."

References

Bibliography
 Mayne, Judith. Directed by Dorothy Arzner. Indiana University Press, 1995

External links
 
 
 

1930 films
1930 drama films
1930s English-language films
American black-and-white films
American drama films
Circus films
Films based on short fiction
Films based on works by Mildred Cram
Films directed by Dorothy Arzner
Films directed by Robert Milton
Films scored by John Leipold
Paramount Pictures films
1930s American films